Amin al-Shami was a Yemeni air force colonel. He died in a car bomb on 11 October 2011.

References 

Year of birth missing
2011 deaths
Yemeni military officers
Deaths by car bomb